Aghasi Ghevondi Khanjian (Agasi Gevondovich Khandzhyan) (January 30, 1901 – July 9, 1936) was First Secretary of the Communist Party of Armenia from May 1930 to July 1936.

Biography 
Khanjian was born in the city of Van, Ottoman Empire (today eastern Turkey). With the onslaught of the Armenian genocide, his family emigrated from the city in 1915 and settled in Russian Armenia, where they took refuge at Etchmiadzin Cathedral. Khanjian enrolled at the Gevorgian Seminary, but gradually became attracted by revolutionary Marxist politics. In 1917–19, he was one of the organizers of Spartak, the Marxist students' union of Armenia. He later served as the secretary of the Armenian Bolshevik underground committee.

In September 1919, Khanjian was elected to the Transcaucasian regional committee of Komsomol. He enrolled in Sverdlov University in 1921. After graduating, he worked as a party official in Leningrad, where he supported Joseph Stalin against the city’s party boss, Grigory Zinoviev. He was also a close associate of Sergei Kirov. Khanjian returned to Armenia in April 1928 and served as a secretary of the Armenian Communist Party in 1928–29, first secretary of the Yerevan City Committee of the Communist Party of Armenia, (March 1929–May 1930); and in May 1930, First Secretary of the Armenian Communist Party.

Khanjian took over the leadership of the Armenian party at a time when the peasants were being forced to give up their land and were being driven onto collective farms, on instructions in Moscow. This provoked widespread resistance. The Soviet press revealed at the time that the communists lost control of parts of Armenia, which were in rebel hands for several weeks in March and April 1920.  Under Khanjian, the process was completed without any reports of armed clashes between rebels and the security services. He proved to be a charismatic Soviet politician and was very popular among the Armenian populace.

Politically, Khanjian was "as much of a nationalist as a Communist could safely be at the time – and probably a little more so." He was a friend and supporter of many Armenian intellectuals, including Yeghishe Charents (who dedicated a poem to him), Axel Bakunts and Gurgen Mahari (all three were subjected to political repressions after Khanjian's death). In a 1935 letter addressed to Stalin criticizing Khanjian, Armenian Bolshevik Aramayis Yerznkyan cited Khanjian's support for the unification of Kars, Nagorno-Karabakh, and Nakhijevan with Soviet Armenia as evidence of the latter's "nationalism."

Death 
Khanjian died under unclear circumstances in Tiflis (Tbilisi) on July 9, 1936. His death was officially declared a suicide, but according to many accounts, he was killed as a result of a political struggle with Lavrenti Beria. Khanjian had openly opposed Stalin's decision to promote Beria to the leadership of the Transcaucasian SFSR in 1931, and Beria had been replacing many of Khanjian's allies in Armenia with his own in the lead up to Khanjian's death. Ronald Grigor Suny describes the circumstances of his death as follows:

Political condemnations of Khanjian came soon after his death. On July 20, 1936, Beria published an article in the newspaper Zarya Vostoka where he accused Khanjian of patronizing "rabid nationalist elements among the Armenian intelligentsia" and "abetting the terrorist group of [Armenian Bolshevik leader Nersik] Stepanyan". By December 1936, the narrative of Khanjian's "suicide" was publicly endorsed by Stalin and even accepted by the USSR's most prominent Armenian politician, Anastas Mikoyan.

Soon after Khanjian's death, Beria promoted his loyalists Amatuni Amatuni as Armenian First Secretary and Khachik Mughdusi as chief of the Armenian NKVD. According to Amatuni in a June 1937 letter to Stalin, 1,365 people were arrested in the ten months after the death of Khanjian, among them 900 "Dashnak-Trotskyists" (Amatuni himself was later arrested in 1937 and shot in 1938). Along with an entire generation of intellectual Armenian communist leaders, Khanjian was denounced as an "enemy of the people" during Stalin's Great Purge.

Khanjian's personal friend Yeghishe Charents wrote a series of seven sonnets dedicated to him after his death, titled "The Dauphin of Nairi: Seven Sonnets to Aghasi Khanjian". Charents was arrested and died in prison in November 1937. On 11 March 1954, in a speech in Yerevan, Mikoyan called for the rehabilitation of Charents, beginning the process of the Thaw in Armenia. Khanjian was officially rehabilitated by Soviet authorities in 1956, two years after Mikoyan's speech and three years after the death of Stalin and the arrest and execution of Beria. An official Soviet investigation concluded that same year that Beria had shot Khanjian dead in his office. In October 1961, KGB Chairman Alexander Shelepin publicly referred to that conclusion at the 22nd Congress of the Soviet Communist Party.

See also
 Armenian SSR
 Armenian victims of the Great Purge

References

1901 births
1936 deaths
Party leaders of the Soviet Union
Great Purge victims from Armenia
People from Van, Turkey
Armenian genocide survivors
Communist Party of Armenia (Soviet Union) politicians
Armenians from the Ottoman Empire
Armenian atheists
Recipients of the Order of Lenin
Emigrants from the Ottoman Empire to the Russian Empire